Manuela Stöberl (born 12 July 1980) is a German female canoeist who won 20 medals at senior level at the Wildwater Canoeing World Championships and European Wildwater Championships.

References

External links
 Manuela Stöberl at ICF

1980 births
Living people
German female canoeists
People from Donauwörth
Sportspeople from Swabia (Bavaria)